State Trunk Highway 175 (often called Highway 175, STH-175 or WIS 175) is a state highway in the US state of Wisconsin. It runs north–south in central Wisconsin from West Milwaukee to just south of Fond du Lac.

The highway follows the former route of U.S. Highway 41 (US 41) before US 41's current route was created between 1953 and 1955. Portions of the highway were part of the Yellowstone Trail. North Fond du Lac created a park dedicated to the trail, which was the first transcontinental automobile highway through the upper tier of states in the United States.

History

The northern terminus was moved from US 45 near Oshkosh to its present location near Fond du Lac. The portion in Winnebago County became County Trunk Highway R (CTH-R), and the portion in Fond du Lac County (including through the Van Dyne, North Fond du Lac, and Fond du Lac communities) became CTH-RP.

Numerous segments of the highway are marked for changing to local control, including segments in Washington County. It formerly went into the city of Fond du Lac before the 2010s, when the city's highway designations changed with the completion of the US 151 bypass.

Beginning in May 2015, US 41 south of Howard underwent conversion to Interstate 41 (I-41) and rerouted to follow an existing freeway alignment in Milwaukee County. Beginning the following month, WIS 175 signs began replacing US 41 signs in the Milwaukee area, where the designation was extended beyond I-94 along the Stadium Freeway, also replacing WIS 341 between the Stadium Interchange and WIS 59.

In 2022, the Wisconsin Department of Transportation began exploring reconstructing Highway 175 in Milwaukee between North Avenue and Vliet Street in the Washington Heights neighborhood of Milwaukee. In 2016, Urban Milwaukee contributor John O'Neill wrote an article suggesting partial removal of the highway in order to improve pedestrian safety.

Major intersections

See also

References

Further reading

External links

175
Transportation in Milwaukee County, Wisconsin
Transportation in Waukesha County, Wisconsin
Transportation in Washington County, Wisconsin
Transportation in Dodge County, Wisconsin
Transportation in Fond du Lac County, Wisconsin
U.S. Route 41